Victor Ketelslegers (born 2002 in Brussels), known professionally as Victor Polster, is a Belgian actor and dancer.

Career 
After developing an interest in dancing, Polster enrolled at the Royal Ballet School of Antwerp. He appeared in a number of television commercials and music videos, before making his film debut in Girl, in which he played the role of Lara, a trans girl who pursues a career as a ballerina. The film premiered at the 2018 Cannes Film Festival, where Polster won the Un Certain Regard Jury Award for Best Performance.

His portrayal received general acclaim from film critics, resulting in numerous accolades. At the 9th Magritte Awards, Girl received nine nominations and won four, including Best Actor for Polster.

Filmography

References

External links

2002 births
21st-century Belgian male actors
Belgian male film actors
Belgian male dancers
Male actors from Brussels
Magritte Award winners
Living people